Mahalabad-e Sofla (also Romanized as Maḩalābād-e Soflá; also known as Maḩalābād-e Pā’īn) is a village in Arabkhaneh Rural District, Shusef District, Nehbandan County, South Khorasan Province, Iran. At the 2006 census, its population was 210, in 56 families.

References 

Populated places in Nehbandan County